Love on a Rooftop (I Love You from Today) is a 2015 South Korean television drama starring Im Se-mi and Park Jin-woo. It aired on KBS2 on Mondays to Fridays at 19:50 for 101 episodes, beginning April 6, 2015.

Plot
Set in a 450-year-old house named "Dongrakdang" in Bukchon Hanok Village, Yoon Seung-hye and the people around her must deal with the aftermath of her adoption and its dissolution.

Cast

Main characters
Im Se-mi as Yoon Seung-hye
Park Jin-woo as Kang Do-jin
Ban Se-jung as Jang Se-ryung

Supporting characters
Kim Yong-rim as Kim Soon-im (Seung-hye's grandmother) 
Ahn Nae-sang as Yoon Dae-ho (Seung-hye's father)
Kim Seo-ra as Han Dong-sook (Seung-hye's mother)
Oh Seung-yoon as Yoon Seung-jae (Seung-hye's younger brother)
Yoon Seo as Yoon Seung-ah (Seung-hye's younger sister)
Choo So-young as Yoon Dae-shil (Seung-hye's aunt and Gyung-tae's Wife)
Lee Eung-kyung as Yang Mi-ja (Do-jin's mother)
Heo Jung-kyu as Bae Sang-man (Mi-ja's secretary)
Lee Chang-wook as Oh Gyung-tae (Do-jin's best friend and Dae-Shil's husband)
Kim Byung-se as Jang Beom-seok (Se-ryung's father)
Go Yoon as Jung Yoon-ho
Jo Eun-sook as Han Sun-sook
Jo Hee-bong as Byun Joon-bae
Hahm Eun-jung as Min Chae-won
Jang Jae-wan as Byun Dong-gu

Cameo appearances
Oh Soon-tae
Jung Sang-hoon
Yoon Ki-won as Hong Seok-choon

Ratings 
 In this table,  represent the lowest ratings and  represent the highest ratings.

Awards and nominations

References

External links
  
 
 

Korean-language television shows
Korean Broadcasting System television dramas
2015 South Korean television series debuts
2015 South Korean television series endings
South Korean romance television series
Television series by AStory